"Hello" is a song by American singer and songwriter Lionel Richie. Taken as the third single from his second solo album, Can't Slow Down (1983), the song was released in 1984 and reached number one on three Billboard music charts: the pop chart (for two weeks), the R&B chart (for three weeks), and the Adult Contemporary chart (for six weeks). The song also went to number one on the UK Singles Chart for six weeks.

The song was subject to a lawsuit by songwriter Marjorie Hoffman White, who accused Richie of plagiarizing her 1978 composition "I'm Not Ready to Go".

Reception
Cash Box said that the song "is as melodic and heartwrenching as anything [Ritchie] has done previously and that’s saying something."

Composition
The song is written in the key of A minor. The verses follow the chord progression of Am9—Cmaj7/G—Fmaj7—C6/G—Fmaj7. The chorus features a Neapolitan chord (Bb).

Music video
The music video for "Hello", directed by Bob Giraldi, features the story of Richie as a theater and acting teacher having a seemingly unrequited love for a blind student (Laura Carrington) until he discovers she shares the feeling as demonstrated by the discovery that she is sculpting a likeness of his head in clay.

Pop culture
The song is memorable for the line "Hello, is it me you're looking for?" The phrase started the song's composition, as when James Anthony Carmichael visited Richie, the singer greeted him that way, to which Carmichael replied, "Finish that song." Richie initially felt that the song was "corny" but ultimately "by the time I finished the verse, I fell in love with the song again." Several publications have commented on similarities in the theme of the song and accompanying video with that of "Hello" by British singer Adele.

Personnel 
 Lionel Richie – vocals, acoustic piano, rhythm and vocal arrangements 
 Reginald "Sonny" Burke – Fender Rhodes
 Michael Boddicker – synthesizers 
 Darrell Jones – electric guitar 
 Tim May – acoustic guitar 
 Louis Shelton – guitars 
 Joe Chemay – bass
 Paul Leim – drums 
 James Anthony Carmichael – rhythm and string arrangements 
 Harry Bluestone – string concertmaster

Charts

Weekly charts

Year-end charts

All-time charts

Certifications

Notable cover versions
A UK garage cover by Jhay Palmer featuring MC Image reached No. 69 on the UK Singles Chart and No. 11 on the UK Dance Singles Chart in 2002.
In 2011, American bachata singer Berto La Voz covered the song which was released as the first single from his debut album Llego La Voz. This version peaked at No. 11 on the Billboard Tropical Songs chart.
In Sept 2015, Jimmy Fallon and Lionel Richie covered the song in a humorous duet on the Tonight Show and the YouTube clip got over one million views.
As a part of the tribute to Richie at the 58th Annual Grammy Awards on February 15, 2016, American singer Demi Lovato gave a rendition of the song. Their cover version eventually peaked at 15 on the Billboard Twitter Top Tracks chart.

See also
List of number-one singles of 1984 (Australia)
List of Belgian number-one singles of 1984 (Flanders))
List of number-one singles of 1984 (Canada)
List of number-one singles of 1984 (Ireland)
List of Dutch Top 40 number-one singles of 1984
List of number-one singles in 1984 (New Zealand)
List of number-one singles of 1984 (Switzerland)
List of UK Singles Chart number ones of 1984
List of Billboard Hot 100 number-one singles of 1984
List of number-one adult contemporary singles of 1984 (U.S.)
List of number-one R&B singles of 1984 (U.S.)
List of Cash Box Top 100 number-one singles of 1984

References

External links
 
 List of cover versions of "Hello" at SecondHandSongs.com

1980s ballads
1983 songs
1984 singles
Billboard Hot 100 number-one singles
Cashbox number-one singles
Dutch Top 40 number-one singles
Irish Singles Chart number-one singles
Kikki Danielsson songs
Lionel Richie songs
Motown singles
Music videos directed by Bob Giraldi
Number-one singles in Australia
Number-one singles in New Zealand
Number-one singles in Switzerland
Pop ballads
RPM Top Singles number-one singles
Song recordings produced by James Anthony Carmichael
Songs involved in plagiarism controversies
Songs written by Lionel Richie
UK Singles Chart number-one singles
Ultratop 50 Singles (Flanders) number-one singles